Stephen D. Hursting is an American scientist and current professor at the University of North Carolina at Chapel Hill. He is the former Margaret McKean Love Chair in Nutrition, Cellular, and Molecular Sciences at the University of Texas at Austin.

References

Year of birth missing (living people)
Living people
University of Texas at Austin faculty
21st-century American biologists
University of North Carolina at Chapel Hill faculty